Bellator 286: Pitbull vs. Borics was a mixed martial arts event produced by Bellator MMA that took place on October 1, 2022, at the Long Beach Arena in Long Beach, California, United States.

Background 
In his first bout since reclaiming the Bellator Featherweight World Championship at Bellator 277 in April, Patrício Pitbull faced off against Ádám Borics, who was on a four-fight winning streak and coming off a unanimous decision win over Mads Burnell at Bellator 276.

A. J. McKee moved up to lightweight for the first time after losing his first bout in his career in a title defense against Patrício Pitbull at Bellator 277 in April. In the opposite corner, he faced Spike Carlyle, who has won five straight bouts since parting ways with the UFC in 2020, and was coming off two techncial submission wins under Bellator contract, against Dan Moret in December at Bellator 272 and Koji Takeda in April at Rizin 35.

At weigh ins, the bout between Juan Archuleta and Enrique Barzola was moved to a catchweight of 141 pounds; while two fighters missed weight; Spike Carlyle, was .6 pounds over the division non-title fight limit at 156.6 lbs, and Dominic Clark, who came in at 2.2 pounds over the limit at 158.2 lbs for his lightweight bout. Carlyle and Clark were fined 20% of their purses and the bouts continued at catchweights.

A Lightweight bout between Mike Hamel and Max Rohskopf was planned for the event; however it was scrapped the day of the event as Rohskopf was not cleared by doctors.

Results

Reported payout
The following is the reported payout to the fighters as reported to the California State Athletic Commission. It is important to note the amounts do not include sponsor money, discretionary bonuses, viewership points or additional earnings.

 Patrício Pitbull: $150,000 (no win bonus) vs. Ádám Borics: $100,000
 A.J. McKee: $105,000 (no win bonus, $5,000 fine from Carlyle) def. Spike Carlyle: $40,000 (includes $10,000 deduction)
 Jeremy Kennedy: $110,000 (includes $55,000 win bonus) def. Aaron Pico: $100,000 
 Juan Archuleta: $100,000 (no win bonus) def. Enrique Barzola: $31,000
 Bobby Seronio III $6,000 (includes $55,000 win bonus)  def. Miguel Peimbert: $3,000
 Islam Mamedov: $80,000 (includes $40,000 win bonus)  def. Nick Browne: $24,000
 Jay Jay Wilson: $70,000 (includes $35,000 win bonus)  def. Vladimir Tokov: $23,000
 Khalid Murtazaliev: $40,000) (includes $20,000 win bonus) def. Khadzhimurat Bestaev: $13,000
 Sumiko Inaba: $24,000 (includes $12,000 win bonus)  def. Nadine Mandiau: $3,000
 Weber Almeida: $36,000 (includes $18,000 win bonus)  def. Ryan Lilley: $5,000
 Lance Gibson Jr.: $15,700 (no win bonus, $700 fine from Clark) def. Dominic Clark: $5,600 (includes $1,400 deduction)
 Cee Jay Hamilton: $30,000 (includes $15,000 win bonus) def. Richard Palencia: $15,000
 Keoni Diggs: $26,000 (includes $13,000 win bonus) def. Ricardo Seixas: $12,000

See also 

 2022 in Bellator MMA
 List of Bellator MMA events
 List of current Bellator fighters
 Bellator MMA Rankings

References 

Events in Long Beach, California
Bellator MMA events
2022 in mixed martial arts
October 2022 sports events in the United States
2022 in sports in California
Mixed martial arts in California
Sports competitions in California